Jody Margolin Hahn is American television director. Her credits include Malcolm & Eddie, Hannah Montana, The Return of Jezebel James, Rita Rocks, Wizards of Waverly Place, Lab Rats, That Girl Lay Lay, and See Dad Run. Prior to television directing, she worked as an associate director, production associate and technical coordinator on the sitcoms Gimme a Break!, Roseanne, The Nanny and Accidentally on Purpose.

References

External links

American television directors
American women television directors
Living people
Place of birth missing (living people)
Year of birth missing (living people)